Dolkun Isa (born 2 September 1967) is a Uyghur activist based in Germany, who has been designated as a terrorist by the Chinese Government since 2003. He is the 3rd and current president of the World Uyghur Congress, in office since 12 November 2017. He previously served as General Secretary and Chairman of the Executive Committee of the congress, respectively, and has spoken on behalf of the rights of the Uyghurs which make up the majority population in that region.  He has also presented Uyghur human rights issues to the UN Human Rights Council, European Parliament, European governments and international human rights organizations.

In 1988, when he was studying at Xinjiang University, he led the students demonstration on 15 June 1988 in Ürümqi against alleged discrimination and unfair treatment of Uyghurs and was expelled from the school in the same year. He later continued his studies in Beijing from 1990 to 1994. In November 1996, he played an important role in establishing the World Uyghur Youth Congress in Germany and served as Executive Chairman and President. In April 2004, he played an important role in the establishment of the World Uyghur Congress. He also served as the Vice-President of UNPO.

Early life and departure from China
Dolkun Isa was born 2 September 1967 in Aksu and raised by his grandparents in Kalpin County in Aksu Prefecture until 9 years old; later he moved back to Aksu City and completed his Middle school and High school there. In 1984 he was admitted by the Faculty of Physics of Xinjiang University and studied there until his dismissal in early 1988, just a half-year before he was to graduate, due to his human rights activities for minorities.  After that he went back to Aksu and worked for education. In 1990 he went to Beijing and studied English and Turkish until 1994. In 1994, he left the country due to a claimed detention threat and studied in Gazi University in Ankara, Turkey and received a master's degree in Politics and Sociology. Later he went to Europe and sought asylum there. In 2006 he became a citizen of Germany.

East Turkestan Independence Movement
China's government claims that Isa is the vice-chairman of the East Turkestan Liberation Organization, however, this is denied by Isa. This claim by China has led to China's issuance of a red notice to Interpol, which has not been acted on by Germany or any other country in the West where he has subsequently traveled. He has been on a Chinese list of wanted terrorists since 2003. Isa has condemned all terrorist activities. 

In February 2018, Isa's red notice was removed by Interpol, to strong protest of China. The removal mollified concerns that Interpol president Meng Hongwei, a Chinese national, would exert undue influence over Interpol's decision-making process. However, on his next return to China, Hongwei was secretly detained by authorities in China for a period of time and resigned.

Olympic boycott
Isa called for a boycott of the 2008 Summer Olympics, which were held in Beijing, due to an alleged cultural genocide that was being conducted against the people of East Turkestan, as China's western Xinjiang region is called by the Uyghurs, and Tibet. Isa told AFP that China had failed to improve human rights in Tibet and Xinjiang, where Beijing is accused by rights groups of cracking down on local ethnic groups. Uyghur activists have been seeking independence or autonomy for East Turkestan.

2006 and 2009 Taiwan controversies
Isa was admitted to Taiwan in 2006 to attend the meeting of the Unrepresented Nations and Peoples Organization, a movement co-founded by Taiwan in 1991, during the administration of pro-localization president Chen Shui-bian.  There were reports in Taiwanese media in July 2009 that Isa had secretly entered the country in the lead-up to the World Games which were hosted in the southern city of Kaohsiung.  This prompted the National Immigration Agency of the then China-friendly KMT government to issue a ban on his travel to Taiwan. Rebiya Kadeer was denied a visa to visit Taiwan later in 2009, a move linked to Isa's alleged connections with terrorists.  Premier Wu Den-yih stated that if Isa or Kadeer stepped down from their respective positions in the World Uyghur Congress as secretary-general and president, the ban would be lifted.

Activities

Meeting with Binali Yıldırım

On 16 February 2018, Turkish Prime Minister Binali Yıldırım met with the President of the World Uyghur Congress Dolkun Isa in Munich, where he came for the World Security Conference.  Isa told the PM about the situation of 11 Uyghurs who were in custody in Malaysia and reminded the PM of the Chinese occupation, forced assimilation, transformation, and religious and ethnic genocide practices in East Turkestan. Dolkun Isa also met with Süleyman Soylu, who is currently the Minister of the Interior of Turkey.

Speaking in European Parliament
On 15 May 2018, on the occasion of a meeting of the Subcommittee on Human Rights (DROI), Isa, Vice-President of the Unrepresented Nations and Peoples Organization (UNPO) and President of the World Uyghur Congress (WUC), together with Sophie Richardson (China Director of Human Rights Watch) and Ulrich Delius (Director of Society for Threatened Peoples), exchanged views on the human rights situation in China, with a special focus on Xinjiang.

Files criminal case in Argentina against China 
Dolkun Isa、Omer Kanat and Michael Polak submitted a criminal case against China  in Buenos Aires, Argentina, for allegedly committing genocide and crimes against humanity against Uyghurs in northwestern China's Xinjiang region, Aug. 17, 2022.

Campaign obstructions

South Korea entry denial
Isa was denied entry into the Republic of Korea and was briefly detained in September 2009 while preparing to attend the World Forum for Democratization in Asia. The Unrepresented Nations and Peoples Organization condemned the detention and warned the Korean government in a letter that China's accusations are groundless and that extradition would certainly result in summary trial and execution at the hands of China's authorities. After being held for two days, Isa was released without being admitted to the country, a move that was condemned by Amnesty International.

Indian visa withdrawal
On 22 April 2016, India had issued a visitor's visa to Isa to attend a conference in Dharamshala. This was viewed as a hardening of India's stance towards China since the Uyghur activist Rebiya Kadeer had previously been denied a visa to visit India. This move by the Indian Government was widely seen by Indian News Media as an act of payback against China for its stand on not supporting JeM Chief Masood Azhar's designation as a terrorist in the UNSC. The Indian government, in a U-turn from its earlier stance, later withdrew Isa's visa on 25 April 2016, a day after China raised objections to India.

Expulsion from UNPFII

On 26 April 2017, Isa, who had intended to participate in the United Nations Permanent Forum on Indigenous Issues (UNPFII), was forced to leave the UN premises. Isa was asked for his identification document by UN security and was then asked to leave the UN premises, denying Isa's request for an explanation.
Isa was expelled from the building on behest of Chinese diplomat and UN DESA Under-Secretary-General Wu Hongbo, who in 2018 defended his action to a studio audience, saying: "When it comes to Chinese national sovereignty and security, we will undoubtedly defend our country's interests." Despite efforts by the UNPO and the Society for Threatened Peoples, under which Isa and fellow human rights activist Omer Kanat were accredited as participants in the Forum, Isa was not able to re-enter the building. Two days after the incident, on 28 April, he was denied a badge to be able to re-enter the UN and participate in the Forum.

Detention by police in Italy
On 26 July 2017, Isa was approached by 15-20 plainclothes members of the Divisione Investigazioni Generali e Operazioni Speciali (DIGOS) while walking with colleagues to the Italian Senate. The officers, who were holding a photo of Isa, stopped him at the gate of the senate building and asked him to accompany them for an identification check, Isa said. The officers loaded him into a car and took him to a nearby police station. The DIGOS police checked Isa's ID, took his photo and fingerprints, and eventually released him after 3:00 p.m.

Prevention from UN forum
On Monday, 16 April 2018, Isa was prevented from entering the UN premises to participate in the first day of the Forum. When asked for an explanation, UN security was unable to elaborate further on the justification for the refusal, citing 'security concerns' once more. Isa remarked that "This represents a clear signal of the success of China's attempts to manipulate the UN system. I am incredibly disappointed and appalled that the UN has been undermined to this extent."

Chinese accusation in the UN
On 21 May 2018, during the resumed session of the Committee on Non-Governmental Organizations in the UN, the Chinese delegation  claimed that Isa had been "participating, inciting and funding separatism and terrorism for years", adding that while participating in regional dialogues at UNPFII he had indicated that he was "representing WUC instead of STP", despite only having accreditation as an STP representative. "All the above actions seriously violates relevant rules and regulations of the United Nations," the letter said, urging the Committee on Non-Governmental Organizations "to uphold the authority of the UN Charter and withdraw the consultative status of STP".

Kelley Currie, the United States representative to the UN for economic and social affairs, accused Beijing of preventing the exiled Uighur activist Dolkun Isa from entering UN headquarters in New York to speak at a forum on indigenous rights in February 2018. Beijing demanded that the UN-accredited organization that invited Isa to speak at the United Nations, the Society for Threatened Peoples, be stripped of its accreditation. The United States sprung to Isa's defense, saying China was seeking to retaliate against an irritating advocate who has shed light on political repression against the Uighurs. The United States and Germany maintain that there is no evidence of links between the two groups.

Death of Isa's mother
On 29 June 2018, Radio Free Asia reported that Isa's mother died while in Xinjiang, according to security officials. In June 2018, Isa learned from a close family friend that his mother, Ayhan Memet, died on 17 May at the age of 78, but the WUC president was unsure if she had been incarcerated in one of the many "political re-education camps" throughout the XUAR, where authorities have been detaining Uyghurs accused of harboring "extremist" and "politically incorrect" thoughts since April 2017.

References

External links
 Dolkun Isa, President of World Uyghur Congress  2019 Democracy Award

Living people
German activists
Uyghur activists
People from Aksu Prefecture
1967 births
Chinese emigrants to Germany